Beyond the Crimson Horizon is the second album by American doom metal band Solitude Aeturnus. It was released by Roadrunner Records.

Track listing 
 Music by Solitude Aeturnus. Lyrics by Lyle Steadham, except where noted.
 "Seeds of the Desolate" – 6:30
 "Black Castle" – 4:08
 "The Final Sin" – 5:41
 "It Came Upon One Night" – 6:57 (lyrics: Kristoff Gabeheart)
 "The Hourglass" – 5:17
 "Beneath the Fading Sun" – 4:26
 "Plague of Procreation" – 6:27
 "Beyond..." – 4:00
 "City of Armageddon (Demo Late 1991)" (2006 reissue bonus track) – 7:39
 "It Came Upon One Night (Demo January 1988)" (2006 reissue bonus track) – 5:55

Personnel 
 Robert Lowe – vocals, keyboards, synthesizers
 Edgar Rivera – guitars
 John Perez – guitars
 Lyle Steadham – bass
 John Covington – drums

Production
 Arranged by Solitude Aeturnus
 Produced by Solitude Aeturnus & Danny Brown
 Engineered and mixed by Tim Grugle & Danny Brown

Charts

Monthly

References 

Solitude Aeturnus albums
1992 albums
Roadrunner Records albums